V. Radhika Selvi (born 29 January 1976) was a member of the 14th Lok Sabha of India. She was the Minister of State for Home Affairs in the Manmohan Singh led ministry. She represented the Tiruchendur constituency of Tamil Nadu.

She is the wife of the late Moolakarai Venkatesh Pannayar Nadar.

References

External links
 Members of Fourteenth Lok Sabha - Parliament of India website

Living people
1976 births
Indian Tamil people
Lok Sabha members from Tamil Nadu
India MPs 2004–2009
Union ministers of state of India
People from Thoothukudi
Politicians from Chennai
Women in Tamil Nadu politics
21st-century Indian women politicians
21st-century Indian politicians
Women union ministers of state of India
People from Thoothukudi district
Dravida Munnetra Kazhagam politicians